The 2008 Fortis Championships Luxembourg was a women's tennis tournament on indoor hard courts. It was the 13th edition of the Fortis Championships Luxembourg, and was part of the Tier III Series of the 2008 WTA Tour. The tournament took place in Kockelscheuer, Luxembourg, from 20 October until 26 October 2008. First-seeded Elena Dementieva won the singles title and earned $35,000 first-prize money.

Finals

Singles

 Elena Dementieva defeated  Caroline Wozniacki 2–6, 6–4, 7–6(7–4)
 It was Elena Dementieva's 3rd singles title of the year and the 11th of her career.

Doubles

 Sorana Cîrstea /  Marina Erakovic defeated  Vera Dushevina /  Mariya Koryttseva 2–6, 6–3, 10–8

External links

 Official website
 ITF tournament edition details
 Tournament draws

Fortis Championships Luxembourg
2008
Fortis Championships Luxembourg